Paul William Bradshaw (born 28 April 1956) is an English former professional footballer who played as a goalkeeper in the Football League for Blackburn Rovers, Wolverhampton Wanderers, West Bromwich Albion, Bristol Rovers, Newport County and Peterborough United, and in the North American Soccer League for the Vancouver Whitecaps.

Career
Bradshaw was born in Altrincham, and began his career as an apprentice at Blackburn Rovers. He signed professionally in June 1973, and broke into the first team in the following season, making 18 appearances in the Third Division. He came to prominence in the 1976–77 season, when he made 41 league appearances, and played in the first ever England under-21 international match, thus attracting the attention of First Division club Wolverhampton Wanderers.

Wolves paid a club record £150,000 for Bradshaw in September 1977. He made his debut on 1 October 1977 in a 3–0 home win over Leicester City and remained the first-choice goalkeeper for the next five seasons. Bradshaw made 243 appearances for Wolves in total, winning the 1980 League Cup, playing in two FA Cup semi-finals and appearing in European competition. He was voted the club's Player of the Year in both 1981 and 1982.

He lost his place to John Burridge for the 1982–83 season, as the club won promotion back to the top flight at the first attempt. Bradshaw remained to play 10 more First Division games for the side before leaving in August 1984 to join the Vancouver Whitecaps of the North American Soccer League.

After the American league folded, Bradshaw returned to England. He joined West Bromwich Albion in February 1985 as a back-up player until he took up a coaching role at Walsall in June 1986. He soon returned to playing though, signing for Bristol Rovers on a non-contract basis, and later played in Newport County final season in the Football League. After a second spell at West Bromwich Albion, he played the 1990–91 season with Peterborough United and finished his career in non-league football with Kettering Town before retiring in 1992.

References

External links
 

1956 births
Living people
People from Altrincham
English footballers
England under-21 international footballers
Association football goalkeepers
Blackburn Rovers F.C. players
Wolverhampton Wanderers F.C. players
Vancouver Whitecaps (1974–1984) players
West Bromwich Albion F.C. players
Bristol Rovers F.C. players
Newport County A.F.C. players
Peterborough United F.C. players
Kettering Town F.C. players
English Football League players
North American Soccer League (1968–1984) players
English expatriate footballers
English expatriate sportspeople in Canada
Expatriate soccer players in Canada
Footballers from Greater Manchester